Abraham Lucas (born October 25, 1998) is an American football offensive tackle for the Seattle Seahawks of the National Football League (NFL). He played college football at Washington State.

Early life and high school
Lucas grew up in Everett, Washington and attended Archbishop Murphy High School, where he played basketball and was an offensive and defensive lineman on the football team. Lucas was rated a three-star recruit and committed to play college football at Washington State over offers from Oregon State and Wyoming.

College career
Lucas redshirted his true freshman season at Washington State. He was named the Cougars' starting right tackle going into his redshirt freshman season. Lucas started all 13 of Washington State's games and was named second-team All-Pac-12 Conference and a freshman All-American by USA Today. He started all of Washington State's games at right tackle as a redshirt sophomore and was again named second-team All-Pac-12. Lucas started all four games of Washington State's COVID-19-shortened 2020 season and was named second-team All-Conference for a third straight season and was also named first-team All-Pac-12 by the Associated Press. He considered entering the 2021 NFL Draft, but opted to return to Washington State for a fifth season. As a redshirt senior, Lucas started 12 games at right tackle and was named first-team All-Pac-12.

Professional career

Throughout the draft process, Lucas was deemed a top overall blocker, specifically in the passing game. He ran a 4.92 s 40-yard dash time, near the top of the offensive line draft class, and played over 2,195 pass-blocking snaps at Washington State University while earning an elite 91+ PFF pass blocking grade. 

The Seahawks selected Lucas in the third round (72nd overall) in the 2022 NFL draft. He signed his rookie contract on May 26, 2022.

References

External links
 Seattle Seahawks bio
Washington State Cougars bio

Living people
American football offensive tackles
Players of American football from Washington (state)
Sportspeople from Everett, Washington
Washington State Cougars football players
Seattle Seahawks players
1998 births